Mount Burch is a peak  high about  southeast of Mount Kelly on the south side of George Glacier, in the Anare Mountains, a major mountain range situated within Victoria Land, Antarctica. The topographical feature was so named by Australian National Antarctic Research Expeditions (ANARE) for W.M. Burch, geophysicist with the ANARE (Thala Dan), 1962, led by Phillip Law, which explored the area. The mountain lies situated on the Pennell Coast, a portion of Antarctica lying between Cape Williams and Cape Adare.

References 

Mountains of Victoria Land
Pennell Coast